Sawai Madhopur was a Lok Sabha parliamentary constituency of Rajasthan.

Members of Parliament

See also
 Sawai Madhopur
 List of Constituencies of the Lok Sabha
 Tonk-Sawai Madhopur (Lok Sabha constituency)

References

Sawai Madhopur
Sawai Madhopur district
Former Lok Sabha constituencies of Rajasthan
Former constituencies of the Lok Sabha
2008 disestablishments in India
Constituencies disestablished in 2008